Księże Pole , is a village in Opole Voivodeship, Głubczyce County, Gmina Baborów, Poland.

Villages in Głubczyce County